Omar Camporese and Goran Ivanišević were the defending champions, but lost in the semifinals to Jakob Hlasek and Marc Rosset.

Hlasek and Rosset won the title by defeating Wayne Ferreira and Mark Kratzmann 6–4, 3–6, 6–1 in the final.

Seeds

Draw

Finals

Top half

Bottom half

References

External links
 Official results archive (ATP)
 Official results archive (ITF)

Men's Doubles